Vincenzo Bonifacio (born 2 June 1630) was a Roman Catholic prelate who served as Titular Bishop of Famagusta (1674–1706).

Biography
Vincenzo Bonifacio was born in Rovigo, Italy on 2 June 1630 and ordained a priest on 23 September 1656.
On 19 February 1674, he was appointed during the papacy of Pope Clement X as Titular Bishop of Famagusta.
On 24 February 1674, he was consecrated bishop by Giambattista Spada, Cardinal-Priest of San Crisogono, with Antonio Pignatelli del Rastrello, Bishop of Lecce, and Francesco de' Marini, Titular Archbishop of Amasea, serving as co-consecrators. 
He served as Titular Bishop of Famagusta  until his resignation on 14 July 1706.

While bishop, he was the principal co-consecrator of Joannes Lucidus Cataneo, Bishop of Mantova (1674).

References 

17th-century Roman Catholic titular bishops
18th-century Roman Catholic titular bishops
Bishops appointed by Pope Clement X
1630 births